Robert Mills may refer to:

Rob Mills (born 1982), Australian musician and television presenter
Robert Mills (architect) (1781–1855), American architect
Robert Mills (physicist) (1927–1999), American physicist
Robert P. Mills (1920–1986), American magazine editor
Robert L. Mills (1916–2006), American president of Georgetown College
Robert Mills (rower) (born 1957), Canadian Olympic rower
Robert Mills (priest), Dean of Dunedin

See also
Bob Mills (disambiguation)